Athanasia Fakidi is a Greek sailor. She won a gold medal at the 2018 Mediterranean Games.

References

Greek athletes
Living people
1996 births
Mediterranean Games gold medalists for Greece
Mediterranean Games medalists in sailing
Competitors at the 2018 Mediterranean Games